Florinel Cristi Mirea (born 13 July 1974 in Craiova) is a former Romanian football player.

References

1974 births
Sportspeople from Craiova
Living people
Romanian footballers
FC Zimbru Chișinău players
Romanian expatriate footballers
Expatriate footballers in Moldova
FC Spartak Vladikavkaz players
Russian Premier League players
Expatriate footballers in Russia
CS Minerul Motru players
FC U Craiova 1948 players
FC Stal Alchevsk players
Ukrainian Premier League players
Expatriate footballers in Ukraine
Romanian expatriate sportspeople in Ukraine
Association football defenders